Zhang Yuge (born May 11, 1996 in Harbin, Heilongjiang, China) is a Chinese singer and actress. She debuted as a member of female idol group SNH48, where she was part of Team SII from its formation to her graduation in 2020; in addition, she was also a member of its sub-units Style-7 and 7Senses.

Career
On 14 October 2012, Zhang Yuge became one of the 26 shortlisted candidates during the recruitment of SNH48 first-generation members. On 12 January 2013, she made her first public appearance during SNH48 Research Students' 1st Stage, "Give Me Power!" On April 30, she was invited to perform at the Shanghai Strawberry Festival 2013, together with other SNH48 members. On 25 May, she performed on the "Blooming For You Concert" with other first-generation members. On 31 December, she performed during Dragon Television's New Year Countdown 2014.

On 18 January 2014, Zhang performed in the SNH48 "Red & White Concert". During SNH48's first General Election, held on 26 July, Zhang came in fifth with 9,061 votes, and became part of SNH48's Senbatsu for their 5th single.

On 17 March 2015, Zhang she went to Saipan to film the music video for "Manatsu no Sounds Good!", of which she took up her first centre position. On 26 July, during SNH48's second General Election, she came in fifth with 32,306 votes. On 31 October, she was announced as one of the members of its sub-unit, Style-7.

On 20 April 2016, it was announced that Zhang would be one of the members of SNH48's sub-unit, 7SENSES. 

On 30 July, Zhang was ranked eighth during SNH48's third General Election with 66,867.5 votes.

On 29 July, 2017, during SNH48's fourth General Election, Zhang came in ninth with 78,345.6 votes.

On 28 July, 2018, during SNH48's fifth General Election, Zhang came in sixteenth with 52,339.94 votes. In the same year, Zhang performed in the TV series "So Young"

On 27 July, 2019, during SNH48's sixth General Election, Zhang came in fourth with 965,200 votes.

In 2020, Zhang participated in the reality girl group survival show Idol Producer 3  which aired on March 12, 2020. She was eliminated in 20th episode with the rank 23rd.

On 31 October 2022, 7SENSES announced that Tako had left the group.

Discography

Singles

With SNH48

EPs

Albums
 Mae Shika Mukanee (2014)

Filmography

Movies

TV series

References

External links
 Official Member Profile 
 
 
 Zhang Yuge on Bilibili 

1996 births
Living people
SNH48 members
Musicians from Harbin
Japanese-language singers
Korean-language singers of China
Chinese Mandopop singers
Chinese film actresses
Chinese television actresses
21st-century Chinese actresses
Singers from Heilongjiang
Youth With You contestants